Dorcadion walteri is a species of beetle in the family Cerambycidae. It was described by Holzschuh in 1991. It is known from Turkey.

See also 
Dorcadion

References

walteri
Beetles described in 1991